National Tainan Institute of Nursing; National Tainan Junior College of Nursing (NTJCN) is a public college in West Central, Tainan, Taiwan.

NTJCN offers several academic programs, including a two-year Associate Degree in Nursing (ADN) program and a four-year Bachelor of Science in Nursing (BSN) program. The courses cover a wide range of topics, including anatomy, physiology, pharmacology, nursing ethics, patient care, and community health.

History
NTIN was founded as the Training Preparation Class of Medical Workers in Southern Taiwan in June 1952. In August 1953, it was renamed, the Taiwan Provincial Tainan Vocational High School of Nursing.

It was upgraded to National Tainan Institute of Nursing on 1 August 2000.

Faculties
 Humanism and Society Science
 Natural and Foundational Medical Science
 Department of Nursing
 Clinical Teacher

Academics
The academic curriculum offered at NTIN includes the following courses:
 Fundamentals of Nursing Group
 Medical and Surgical Nursing Group
 Maternity and Pediatrics Nursing Group
 Public Health and Psychiatric Nursing Group
 Basic medical science Group

Nursing Curriculum
A student who attends the nursing school will have the following courses:
 General education courses: Chinese, English, chemistry, music, drama, art, etc.
 Professional foundation courses: nutriology, psychology, anatomy, physiology, microbiology, pharmacology, physical assessment, and related experimental courses.
 Professional core courses: fundamental nursing, medical-surgical nursing, maternal-newborn nursing, pediatric nursing, psychiatric nursing, public health nursing, and experimental and practical courses of all nursing branches.
 Professional required and elective courses formulated by the school: long-term care, geriatric care, hospice care, critical care, emergency care, rehabilitation care, clinical test data interpretation, Chinese medical science, and related pragmatic courses that are required or elective.
 Required and elective general knowledge courses: computer, sports and leisure, livelihood esthetics, thanatology (death studies), introduction to environmental protection science, English conversation, career planning, etc.
 Clinical Practical Training: On-site (or clinical) practical training places consist of the subsidiary medical centre of NCKU, CHI-MEI medical centre, Tainan city hospital, SINLAU hospital, Jianan Psychiatric Centre, Tainan hospital, KUO general hospital in Tainan, the public health centre of Tainan city, etc.

Simulation in nursing and midwifery education

Characteristic Teaching Center

 Multimedia Audiovisual Teaching Center of Medical-Surgical Nursing and Critical Care NursingThe Multimedia Audiovisual Teaching Center was established to promote the quality of medical-surgical nursing. It comprises the modern demonstration wards, critical care units, advanced simulators, modern medical equipment, and various teaching aids which are used to train the students efficiently and enhance the students' abilities to take care of patients. There is also audiovisual equipment for students to participate in self-guided learning. Students in the center learn to perform medical-surgical nursing skills, such as the practice of under-water seal drainage, colostomy care skills, and assessments of cardiopulmonary function.
 Division of Basic Medical ScienceThe Division of Basic Medical Science of NTIN is responsible for teaching and training students to study basic medical science, which encompasses Biology, Human Anatomy, Physiology, Pathology, Pharmacology, Microbiology, Molecular Biology and Immunology. Research facilities and equipment such as human tissue slides, modules, microtome, flow cytometry, and protein 2D-system. The division also hosts and annual Teenagers' Biomedical Summer Camp.
 Maternal-Child Education CenterThis center was established to improve the quality of teaching in maternal care and childcare. Here students learn relevant concepts such as breastfeeding, contraceptives, and physical assessment for perinatal mothers and newborns.
 Holistic Health Care Demonstration CenterThe nursing school's Holistic Health Care Demonstration Center is mainly concerned with aging. Students can undergo a simulated aging experience and training in issues such as housing for the elderly, an exercise program for psychomotor function with visual aids, and long-term care demonstrations.
 The Center for Health Promotion and EducationThe National Tainan Institute of Nursing's Center of Health Promotion and Education was established in 2002 for courses that require demonstrations as well as research associated with health promotion.The Center houses equipment for health-related physical fitness tests, multimedia health education, and general health promotion.

Administration
President Office
Vice President Office
Secretariat Office
Office of Academic Affairs
Office of Student Affairs 
Office of General Affairs
Personnel Department
Accounting Department
Studies Division
Environmental Protection and Occupational Safety and Health Center/Environmental and Occupational Health Center
Alumni

See also
 List of universities in Taiwan

References

External links
 

1952 establishments in Taiwan
Educational institutions established in 1952
Junior colleges in Taiwan
Nursing schools in Taiwan
Universities and colleges in Tainan
Universities and colleges in Taiwan
Technical universities and colleges in Taiwan